Kempegowda International Airport Halt railway station (station code: KIAD) is an Indian Railways' railway station located near Kempegowda International Airport, Bangalore in the Indian state of Karnataka which is located about 45 km away from the  on Yelahanka–Kolar line. This station will serve the Kempegowda International Airport.

History
In 2014, BIAL had suggested building a halt train station on a line which runs along the northeast boundary of the airport. in 2019 it received permission to construct halt station on the existing Yalahanka–Devanahalli line.. The station is being built by the airport operator, Bangalore International Airport Limited (BIAL), Upon completion, the station will be handed over to the railways.

Structure & expansion
Kempegowda International Airport Halt has 1 platform running to 400m in length. Shelters, lighting, benches and a booking office facility are available.

Trains between Bengaluru and Kempegowda International Airport Halt Station

Info credit: twitter.com/PCMohanMP

See also 
Namma Metro
Bengaluru Commuter Rail
List of railway stations in India
Kempegowda Halt location map

References

External links 

Railway stations in Bangalore
Bangalore railway division